Ramesh Tendulkar (18 December 1930 – 19 May 1999) was an Indian Marathi poet and novelist. He is the father of cricketer Sachin Tendulkar.

Early life and education
Tendulkar was born in Alibag, Maharashtra. He used to live at Thikrul Naka, Alibag. He completed his primary and secondary education from Konkan Education Society, Alibag. He went to Mumbai for pursuing his higher education. After completing his education, Tendulkar was a professor at Kirti M. Doongursee College, Mumbai in the 1960s.

Literary career
Tendulkar published many collections. The following is a partial list of them.
 बालकवींची कविता : तीन संदर्भ : Bālakavīncī Kavitā : Tīn Sandarbha
 मानस लहरी  : Mānas Laharī
 प्राजक्त : Prājakta
 मराठी रोमँटिक काव्यप्रतिभा : Marāṭhī Romaṇṭik Kāvyapratibhā

Death
Ramesh Tendulkar died, on 19 May 1999, after a heart attack at the age of 68.

References 

Marathi-language writers
1934 births
1999 deaths